Soleymanabad (also Romanized as Soleymānābād; also known as Sulaimānābād) is a village in Barzavand Rural District, in the Central District of Ardestan County, Isfahan Province, Iran. At the 2006 census, its population was 22, in 11 families.

References 

Populated places in Ardestan County